Daneshill Park Woods is a   Local Nature Reserve in Basingstoke in Hampshire. It is owned and managed by Basingstoke and Deane Borough Council.

These woods have hazel coppice, an old orchard, scrub and a sunken lane. Ground flora include wood anemone, celandine and bluebells.

References

Local Nature Reserves in Hampshire